Land: How the Hunger for Ownership Shaped the Modern World is a 2021 book by Simon Winchester.

Content
The book details different conceptions of land ownership and the history of land ownership. It also discusses conflicts stemming from disagreements over land.

Reception

Critical reception
Francisco Cantú's review in The New Yorker was mixed, praising Winchester's prose. However, Cantú noted a nostalgic tone that at times undercut the depictions of land appropriation and violence. Writing for the New York Times, Aaron Retica criticized the book for not "[coming] together" due to its lack of an identifiable thesis. In the Financial Times, Delphine Strauss did identify a thesis to the book: that most disputes are fundamentally about land.

Literary review aggregator Book Marks noted that reviews of the book were mostly "Positive".

References

External links
Interview with Winchester on Land, February 17, 2021, C-SPAN

2021 non-fiction books
HarperCollins books
Books about economic history
Books about social history
Land tenure
English-language books